Élisabeth Paradis (born July 15, 1992) is a Canadian former competitive ice dancer. With François-Xavier Ouellette, she won bronze medals at  the 2015 CS U.S. International Classic and at the 2016 Canadian Nationals.

Career

Early career 
Paradis skated with Tristan Laliberté from the 2007–08 season through 2009–10. They won the 2009 Canadian novice silver medal and placed 14th on the junior level the following year.

Partnership with François-Xavier Ouellette 
Paradis began competing with François-Xavier Ouellette in the 2010–11 season. Appearing on the junior level, they placed 5th at the 2011 Canadian Nationals and 6th in 2012. They moved up to the senior level in the 2012–13 season.

Making their international debut, Paradis/Ouellette placed fifth at the 2013 International Cup of Nice. They finished 8th at the 2014 Canadian Nationals.

Paradis/Ouellette began the 2014–15 season at an ISU Challenger Series (CS) event, the 2014 Nebelhorn Trophy, finishing fifth, and then appeared on the Grand Prix (GP) series, having received two assignments. They finished fourth overall at the 2014 Skate America (8th in the short dance, 4th in the free), and 7th at the 2014 Skate Canada International. They placed fifth at the 2015 Canadian Nationals.

In 2015–16, Paradis/Ouellette won bronze at their CS assignment, the 2015 U.S. International Classic. They were eighth at their sole GP event, the 2015 Skate Canada International. In January 2016, they placed fourth in the short dance and third in the free at the Canadian Nationals in Halifax, Nova Scotia, winning the bronze medal by a margin of 0.22 over Alexandra Paul / Mitchell Islam.

Paradis/Ouellette announced the end of their partnership on September 7, 2016.

Programs 
(with Ouellette)

Competitive highlights 
GP: Grand Prix; CS: Challenger Series

With Ouellette

With Laliberté

References

External links 
 

1992 births
Canadian female ice dancers
Living people
Sportspeople from Quebec City